24 Hour Psycho is the title of an art installation created by artist Douglas Gordon in 1993.

Summary
The work consists entirely of an appropriation of Alfred Hitchcock's 1960 Psycho slowed down to approximately two frames a second, rather than the usual 24. As a result, it lasts for exactly 24 hours, rather than the original 109 minutes. The film was an important work in Gordon's early career, and is said to introduce themes common to his work, such as "recognition and repetition, time and memory, complicity and duplicity, authorship and authenticity, darkness and light".

In popular culture
24 Hour Psycho is featured prominently in Don DeLillo's book Point Omega.

See also
 List of longest films

References

British avant-garde and experimental films
1993 films
British independent films
British contemporary works of art
Young British Artists
Psycho (franchise)
Alternative versions of films
British black-and-white films
1990s English-language films
1990s British films